VTV may refer to:

Vaikundar Thirukkudumbam version, one among the versions of the holy book of Ayyavazhi
Vinnaithaandi Varuvaayaa, a Tamil movie released in 2010
VTV Ganesh (born 1961), Indian actor, comedian, and film producer
V. T. Vijayan, film editor
, the Finnish State Audit Office

Television channels, stations and networks

Operating 
 VTV (Belarusian TV channel)
 VTV (Pakistan), Virtual University of Pakistan's TV channel
 VTV (San Salvador), a television station operated by Telecorporación Salvadoreña
 VTV (TV station), a station in Victoria, Australia
 VTV (Vietnam), the national government-owned television network in Vietnam
 Vale TV, a Venezuelan educational TV station
 Venezolana de Televisión, a state-owned Venezuelan television station
 Villa TV, a Maldivian private TV channel
 , a local TV station in Varaždin, Croatia
 , a television channel in Honduras, owned by Albavisión
 , a pay television channel in Paraguay, owned by Personal TV
 , a pay television channel in Uruguay, owned by Paco Casal
 VTV Gujarati, a 24-hour regional news channel in Gujarat, India
 VTV (Indonesia), a television network in Indonesia

Defunct 
VTV Vaša Televízia, defunct Slovak TV station
VTV (Dutch TV channel), a defunct television channel in the Netherlands
Variety Television Network, a defunct digital subchannel network owned by Newport Television
VTV (Vancouver Television), the former on-air brand of CIVT-TV (CTV British Columbia)